Eglė Janulevičiūtė (born in Kaunas) is a Lithuanian classical pianist.

She trained at the Lithuanian Academy of Music. In 1993, she moved to London to attend Guildhall School of Music and Drama and in 1996 moved to the United States. She has master's degree from Bowling Green State University and doctorate from University of California, Santa Barbara. She is an adjunct professor at Westmont College.

References

External links
Website

Living people
Year of birth missing (living people)
Lithuanian classical pianists
Lithuanian women pianists
Cleveland International Piano Competition prize-winners
Alumni of the Guildhall School of Music and Drama
Lithuanian Academy of Music and Theatre alumni
21st-century classical pianists
Bowling Green State University alumni
21st-century women pianists